Milan Katić (born 22 October 1993) is a Serbian professional volleyball player. He is a member of the Serbia national team. At the professional club level, he plays for Gazprom-Ugra Surgut.

Honours

Clubs
 CEV Cup
  2021/2022 – with Vero Volley Monza

 CEV Challenge Cup
  2014/2015 – with Vojvodina Novi Sad

 National championships
 2009/2010  Serbian Cup, with Vojvodina Novi Sad
 2011/2012  Serbian Cup, with Vojvodina Novi Sad
 2014/2015  Serbian Cup, with Vojvodina Novi Sad
 2017/2018  Polish SuperCup, with PGE Skra Bełchatów
 2017/2018  Polish Championship, with PGE Skra Bełchatów
 2018/2019  Polish SuperCup, with PGE Skra Bełchatów

Youth national team
 2011  CEV U19 European Championship
 2011  FIVB U19 World Championship

References

External links

 
 Player profile at LegaVolley.it 
 Player profile at PlusLiga.pl 
 Player profile at Volleybox.net

1993 births
Living people
Sportspeople from Belgrade
Serbian men's volleyball players
European Games competitors for Serbia
Volleyball players at the 2015 European Games
Serbian expatriate sportspeople in Turkey  
Expatriate volleyball players in Turkey
Serbian expatriate sportspeople in Poland
Expatriate volleyball players in Poland
Serbian expatriate sportspeople in Italy
Expatriate volleyball players in Italy
Serbian expatriate sportspeople in Russia
Expatriate volleyball players in Russia
Galatasaray S.K. (men's volleyball) players
BKS Visła Bydgoszcz players
Skra Bełchatów players
LKPS Lublin players
Outside hitters
21st-century Serbian people